Fox Corporation (stylized in all-caps as FOX Corporation) is a publicly traded American mass media company operated and controlled by media mogul Rupert Murdoch and headquartered at 1211 Avenue of the Americas in New York City. Incorporated in Delaware, it was formed in 2019 as a result of the acquisition of 21st Century Fox by the Walt Disney Company. The remaining assets that were not acquired by Disney were spun off from 21st Century Fox as Fox Corporation. Its stock began trading on March 19, 2019. The company is controlled by the Murdoch family via a family trust with 39.6% ownership share.

Rupert Murdoch is chair, while his son Lachlan Murdoch is executive chair and CEO. Fox Corp. deals primarily in the television broadcast, news, and sports broadcasting industries. They include the Fox Broadcasting Company, Fox Television Stations, Fox News, Fox Business, the national operations of Fox Sports, and others. Its sister company under Murdoch's control, News Corp, holds his newspaper interests and other media assets.

History
The company name traces back through a series of mergers and demergers to the Fox Film Corporation founded by William Fox on February 1, 1915.

Formation
On December 14, 2017 The Walt Disney Company announced its intent to acquire the motion picture, cable entertainment, and direct broadcast satellite divisions of 21st Century Fox, including 20th Century Fox, for $52.4 billion. The remainder of the company would form a so-called "New Fox", maintaining control of assets such as Fox's television network and broadcast stations (which Disney, already owning ABC, would be legally unable to own due to an FCC policy known as the "dual network rule", which prohibits mergers between the top broadcast networks), Fox News, the national operations of Fox Sports, and the 20th Century Fox studio lot, which would be leased to Disney for seven years. Fox's regional sports networks were also included in the sale, but were later divested by order of the Department of Justice, on the grounds that the Fox regional networks' combination with Disney's 80% ownership of ESPN would make Disney too dominant in the cable sports market.

In May 2018 it was confirmed that Lachlan Murdoch, rather than James Murdoch, would take charge of the New Fox company.

In mid-2018 NBCUniversal's parent company Comcast instigated bidding wars over both the Fox assets Disney planned to purchase, and the British broadcaster Sky plc (a company which 21st Century Fox held a stake in, and was planning to acquire the remainder). In July 2018, Fox agreed to an increase of Disney's offer to $71.3 billion to fend off Comcast's counter-bid. British regulators ordered that a blind auction be held for Sky's assets, which was won by Comcast.

On October 10, 2018, it was reported that in preparation for the impending completion of the sale, the new, post-merger organizational structure of "New Fox" would be implemented by January 1, 2019. On November 14, 2018, it was revealed that the new independent company will maintain the original Fox name. On January 7, 2019, Fox Corporation's registration statement was filed by the U.S. Securities and Exchange Commission.

On January 11, 2019, Fox stated in a securities filing that it had no plans to bid on its former regional sports networks; they would instead go to a consortium led by Sinclair Broadcast Group, with Fox Corporation continuing to license the FSN name to those stations until Sinclair developed a new brand (the networks would eventually become Bally Sports). On March 12, 2019, Disney announced that the sale would be completed by March 20, 2019. On March 19, 2019, Fox Corporation officially began trading on the S&P 500, replacing 21st Century Fox on the index. Republican politician and former Speaker of the House Paul Ryan also joined Fox Corporation's board at this time.

Under the terms of the acquisition, Disney will phase out the Fox brand usage by 2024.

Beginning of operations
Fox Corporation began operating separately on March 19, 2019. Chairman and CEO Lachlan Murdoch led a town hall meeting three days later, indicating that stock would be issued to the corporation's employees based on longevity.

In May 2019 via the Fox Sports division, Fox Corporation acquired a 4.99% stake in Canadian online gambling operator The Stars Group for $236 million. As a result, it was also announced that the companies would co-develop sports betting products for the U.S. market under the branding Fox Bet.

In early July 2019, Fox Entertainment announced the formation of SideCar, with executives led by Gail Berman. SideCar is a content development unit for Fox and other outlets.

In August 2019, Fox Corporation acquired Credible Labs for $397 million and animation studio Bento Box Entertainment for $50 million.

On April 20, 2020, Fox Corporation acquired streaming service Tubi for $440 million.

In June 2020, SideCar was shut down by Fox.

In September 2021, Fox Corporation acquired TMZ from WarnerMedia in a deal worth about $50 million with TMZ being operated under the Fox Entertainment division.

In December 2021, Fox Corporation acquired the film and television production studio MarVista Entertainment.

In September 2022, Fox Corporation announced the launch of Fox Entertainment Studios. This is the company's first venture into entirely in-house television production. The studio debuted its first show, Monarch, on September 11, 2022. Fox also announced that Fox Entertainment would re-enter the international distribution business by launching a sales unit called Fox Entertainment Global.

Abandoned re-merger with News Corp
On October 14, 2022, it was announced that, under the instruction of Rupert Murdoch, a special committee had been established to explore a potential merger of Fox and News Corp, bringing the two companies back together after the former 21st Century Fox was spun-off from News Corp in 2013. On January 24, 2023, the proposed merger was abandoned by Murdoch.

Corporate governance

Board of directors
 Rupert Murdoch (Chair)
 Lachlan Murdoch (Executive Chair)
 William A. Burck
 Chase Carey
 Anne Dias
 Roland A. Hernandez
 Jacques Nasser
 Paul Ryan

Executive management

 '''Lachlan Murdoch, Executive Chair and chief executive officer
 John P. Nallen, Chief Operating Officer
 Viet D. Dinh, Chief Legal and Policy Officer
 Jeffrey A. Taylor, Executive Vice President and General Counsel
 Danny O'Brien, Executive Vice President and Head of Government Relations
 Steve Tomsic, Chief Financial Officer
 Gabrielle Brown, Chief Investor Relations Officer and Executive Vice President
 Michael Biard, President, Operations and Distribution
 Paul Cheesbrough, Chief Technology Officer and President of Digital
 Marianne Gambelli, President of Advertising Sales
 Kevin Lord, Executive Vice President and Chief Human Resources Officer
 Brian Nick, Chief Communications Officer and Executive Vice President
 Jack Abernethy, Chief Executive Officer, Fox Television Stations
 Suzanne Scott, Chief Executive Officer, Fox News Media
 Eric Shanks, Chief Executive Officer and Executive Producer, Fox Sports
 Rob Wade, Chief Executive Officer, Fox Entertainment

Assets

As of September 2022.
Fox Entertainment
 Fox Broadcasting Company
 Fox Now
 Animation Domination
 Bento Box Entertainment
 Princess Bento Studio
 Sutikki
 Bento Box Interactive
 Fox Alternative Entertainment
 Studio Ramsay Global
 TMZ
 XOF Productions
 Tubi
 MarVista Entertainment
 Fox First Run
 Fox Entertainment Studios
 Fox Entertainment Global
 Fox Television Stations
 28 regional affiliates
 MyNetworkTV
 Movies! (50% JV with Weigel Broadcasting)
 Fox Soul
 Fox News Media
 Fox News Channel
 Fox Business
 Fox News Radio
 Fox News Talk (radio)
 Fox Nation 
 Fox Weather
 myFoxHurricane.com – a website related to weather. It was launched in 2008.
 Live Now from Fox, a streaming channel 
 Fox Sports Media Group
 FS1
 FS2
 Fox Deportes (Spanish language)
 Fox Sports Argentina (brand licensing agreement with Mediapro)
 Big Ten Network (61%)
 Fox Soccer Plus
 Fox Sports Racing 
 Fox Sports Radio (brand licensing agreement with iHeartMedia/Premiere Networks)
 Fox Bet
 Fox Sports Digital Media
 FoxSports.com
 Flutter Entertainment (2.6%)
OutKick
 National Spring Football League Enterprises (JV with Brian Woods)
 United States Football League (2022)
 Credible Labs (67%)
 Fox Studios, Los Angeles

Libraries

Fox Entertainment library
 Fox Broadcasting Company library
 Bento Box Entertainment library
 Fox Alternative Entertainment library
 Studio Ramsay Global library
 TMZ library
 XOF Productions library
 Tubi originals library
 Gumby library
 MarVista Entertainment library
 Fox First Run library
 Fox Entertainment Studios library
 Fox Television Stations library
 MyNetworkTV library
 Fox Soul library
 Fox News Media library
 Fox News Channel library
 Fox Movietone News library
 Fox Business library
 Fox Nation library
 Fox Weather library
 Fox Sports Media Group library
 FS1 library
 FS2 library
 Fox Deportes library
 Big Ten Network (61%) library
 Fox Soccer Plus library
 Fox Bet library

References

External links
 

 
News Corporation
2019 establishments in New York City
2010s in Manhattan
American companies established in 2019
Broadcasting companies of the United States
Companies based in Manhattan
Companies listed on the Nasdaq
Corporate spin-offs
Mass media companies based in New York City
Mass media companies established in 2019
Publicly traded companies based in New York City